The Nepal National Library is the legal deposit and copyright library of Nepal under the Ministry of Education, Science and Technology.

History 
It was established on 2 January 1957 and was initially based around the purchased private collection of Rajguru Hem Raj Pandey, an advisor to King Mahendra of Nepal. Items of the Central Secretariat Library were also brought into the collection totaling 34,292 items at the time of the foundation. The library is located at Pulchowk near UNDP complex. At present the library has around 84,000 volumes of books, journals and other materials in different languages.

See also
Kaiser library
Tribhuvan University Central Library

References

External links 
 

1957 establishments in Nepal
Archives in Nepal
Government agencies established in 1957
Government agencies of Nepal
Libraries established in 1957
Libraries in Nepal
National libraries
Nepalese culture